Gareth Craig Snell (born 1 January 1986) is a British politician who served as Member of Parliament (MP) for Stoke-on-Trent Central from 2017 to 2019. A member of the Labour and Co-operative parties, he was Leader of Newcastle-under-Lyme Borough Council from 2012 to 2014. In July 2022, Snell was reselected as the Labour Parliamentary Prospective Candidate for Stoke-on-Trent Central.

Early life 
Snell was educated at Stowmarket High School in Suffolk, East Anglia, and graduated from Keele University in 2008 after studying History and Politics.
While studying at Keele in 2004, Snell founded Keele Labour Students.

Political career
Snell unsuccessfully stood for election to Newcastle-under-Lyme Borough Council in 2007 and 2008, but was finally elected to represent Knutton and Silverdale ward in May 2010. He was elected as the Leader of the Council after Labour won a majority at the 2012 local elections. During his tenure, the council became a living wage employer, joined the Co-operative Council network and implemented a 'no redundancies' policy. Seeking re-election in Chesterton ward, Snell's leadership came to an end upon narrowly losing to the UKIP candidate in May 2014. However, he returned as a councillor in a by-election for Silverdale and Parksite ward in August 2016, and served until his term expired in May 2018.

In January 2017, Snell was selected as the Labour Party candidate in the Stoke-on-Trent Central by-election, triggered following the resignation of Tristram Hunt. Held on 23 February, he won the seat with a reduced vote share but saw off a challenge from UKIP leader Paul Nuttall.

He was re-elected with a majority of nearly 4,000 on 8 June 2017. This was an increase of the figure of 2,600 at the by-election, but compares to 20,000 from 1997. Snell lost his seat in the 2019 general election to Conservative Jo Gideon, predicting his defeat even before his result was announced on BBC television.

Political views 
Snell supported Remain in the 2016 EU referendum, but opposed a second referendum and supported an exit deal to avoid leaving without one.

West Midlands Mayoral Election 
Between 2020 and 2021, Snell was Campaign Manager for the Member of Parliament (MP) for Birmingham Hodge Hill, Liam Byrne in the 2021 West Midlands mayoral election, where Byrne lost. Snell was in charge of managing volunteers and staff, as well as coordinating messaging and fundraising.

References

External links

1986 births
Living people
Alumni of Keele University
Councillors in Staffordshire
Labour Party (UK) councillors
Labour Co-operative MPs for English constituencies
People from Newcastle-under-Lyme
People from Stowmarket
UK MPs 2015–2017
UK MPs 2017–2019
Leaders of local authorities of England